The  Capivaras River is a river of Santa Catarina state in southeastern Brazil. It is part of the Uruguay River basin and a tributary of the Das Contas River.

See also
List of rivers of Santa Catarina

References

Rivers of Santa Catarina (state)